M. Jean McLane (born Myrtle Jean MacLane) (September 14, 1878 – January 23, 1964), was an American portraitist. Her works were exhibited and won awards in the United States and in Europe. She made portrait paintings of women and children. McLane also made portrait paintings of a Greek and Australian Premiers and Elisabeth, Queen of the Belgians.

Personal life
    
Myrtle Jean McLane born in Chicago, Illinois on September 14, 1878. 

While a student at the School of the Art Institute of Chicago she met John Christen Johansen and later became his wife. She then had a studio and lived in New York. They had a son John and daughter Margaret. The family spent their summers at Weyborne Hill in Stockbridge, Massachusetts and sometimes traveled to Europe. Their winters were spent in Greenwich Village.

She died in Stamford, Connecticut; Her residence at the time was in New Canaan, Connecticut.

Education
She first studied with John Vanderpoel at the School of the Art Institute of Chicago and later in Cincinnati under Frank Duveneck and in New York City under William M. Chase.

McLane also studied in Italy, Spain and France.

Career
Johansen and McLane helped to found the National Foundation of Portrait Painters in 1912. Asked by a group of philanthropists to help depict the Allied Leaders from World War I she provided the only female subject, Queen Elisabeth of the Belgians, This painting today is exhibited in the National Museum of American Art.

In 1912, she was elected an associate to the National Academy of Design and a full academician in 1926. She was a member of the National Society of Portrait Painters.

Her Portrait of Virginia and Stanton Arnold (Brother and Sister) was awarded the 1913 Third Hallgarten Prize at the National Academy of Design, and also won the 1914 Lippincott Prize at the Pennsylvania Academy of the Fine Arts as the best figurative piece by an American artist in oil. Her painting "Portrait Mrs. Edmund D. Libby" was included in the Fourth Annual Exhibition of Selected Paintings by American Artists and "The Baby" was included in the Fifth Annual Exhibition of Selected Paintings by American Artists held at the Detroit Museum of Art April 16 to May 31, 1919.

She made portraits of Elisabeth, Queen of the Belgians, Premier Hughes of Australia, and Premier Eleftherios Venizelos. She and her husband were among artists who were commissioned by the National Portrait Gallery committee to create portraits of World War I soldiers and statesmen. Another woman artist was Cecilia Beaux. The exhibition of 20 portraits, including Johansen's Signing the Peace Treaty, June 28, 1919, circulated among American cities.

Her works are in the collections of the Metropolitan Museum of Art and the Smithsonian American Art Museum. Her work was also part of the painting event in the art competition at the 1932 Summer Olympics.

Awards
She received the following awards:
 1904 – Bronze medal, St. Louis Universal Exposition
 1907 – First prize, International League, Paris
 1907 – Elling Prize, New York Woman's Art Club
 1908 – First prize, International League, Paris
 1908 – Burgess Prize, New York Woman's Art Club
 1910 – Silver medal, International Exposition, Buenos Aires
 1912 – Julia A. Shaw Prize, National Academy of Design
 1913 – Third Hallgarten Prize, National Academy of Design
 1914 – Walter Lippincott Prize, Pennsylvania Academy of the Fine Arts

Works
Some of McLane's works are:
Autumn breeze, by 1911
Autumnae
Boy with kite, by 1911
Brother and sister, 1913
Elizabeth Buehrmann, 1900s–1910s, Metropolitan Museum of Art
Girl in Gray, Art Museum of Toledo
Girl in Green, 1912
Johansen Girl, 1930
Italian mother and babe, by 1911
Italian nurse and child, by 1911
Laughing mother and babe, by 1911
Margaret and Her Brother, 1917
Markle Children
Master Haussenier, Jr, 1913
Morning, 1925
Mother and babe, autumn, by 1911
Mother and babe, springtime, by 1911
Mr. Johansen, 1926
Mrs. Fanny E. Davies, 1934
Mrs. Henry Hammond and daughter, 1912
Mrs. Mackey, 1912
Mrs. Tracy Voughts
Mrs. Walbridge
On a Hill Top, 1908
Portrait of Baby Gilbert Barton, by 1911
Portrait of Baby Gilbert Barton, by 1911
Portrait of Baby Margaret Johansen, by 1911
Portrait of Master Filo H., by 1911
Portrait of Miss Margaret Rhodes, by 1911
Portrait of Miss Ruth K., by 1911
Portrait of Mrs. Enos M. Barton, by 1911
Portrait of Mrs. Finley D. Cook, by 1911
Portrait of Mrs. R. G. Arnold and children, by 1911
Rev. G.A. Studdart Kennedy, 1924
Sweet peas, by 1911
Tennis Days, 1932
The Feathered Hat

References

Further reading

External links

1878 births
1964 deaths
19th-century American painters
20th-century American painters
American women painters
20th-century American women artists
19th-century American women artists
American portrait painters
Artists from Chicago
Painters from Illinois
School of the Art Institute of Chicago alumni
Students of William Merritt Chase
Olympic competitors in art competitions